Gimbap, also romanized as kimbap, is a Korean dish made from cooked rice and ingredients such as vegetables, fish, and meats that are rolled in gim (김)—dried sheets of seaweed—and served in bite-sized slices. The origins of gimbap are debated. Some sources suggest it originates from Japanese norimaki, introduced during Japanese colonial rule, while others argue it is a modernized version of bokssam from the Joseon era. Regardless, it has since become a distinct dish. The dish is often part of a packed meal, or dosirak, to be eaten at picnics and outdoor events, and can serve as a light lunch along with danmuji (yellow pickled radish) and kimchi. It is a popular take-out food in South Korea and abroad and is known as a convenient food because of its portability.

Etymology
Gim refers to edible seaweed in the genus Porphyra and Pyropia. Bap broadly refers to cooked rice. The compound term gimbap is a neologism; it was not a part of the Korean language until the modern era. A similar dish, cooked rice rolled with gim, was called bokssam in the Joseon era (1392–1897).

The term gimbap was used in a 1935 Korean newspaper article but at the time, the loanword norimaki was used as well. Norimaki, borrowed from the name of a similar Japanese dish, was part of the Japanese vocabulary that entered into the Korean language during Japanese  occupation (1910–1945). The two words were used interchangeably until gimbap was made the universal term, as part of efforts to clear away remnants of Japanese colonialism and purify the Korean language.

History
The origins of gimbap are debated. A Japanese theory suggests that the dish is derived from the introduction of the Japanese sushi variant makizushi to Korea during the Japanese occupation of Korea. During that period, Korean cuisine adopted Western food and drink, as well as some Japanese food items such as bento (dosirak in Korean) or sushi rolled in sheets of seaweed. Since then, gimbap has become a distinct dish, often utilizing traditional Korean flavors, as well as sesame oil, instead of rice vinegar. This theory is supported by a newspaper from 1935, in which the term gimbap first appeared in Korea.

An alternative theory, suggested in the Encyclopedia of Korean Culture, published by the Academy of Korean Studies, is that the food was developed from the long-established local tradition of rolling bap (cooked rice) and banchan (side dishes) in gim. Production of gim (김) in Gyeongsang and Jeolla provinces is reported in books from the fifteenth century, such as Gyeongsang-do Jiriji and Sinjeung Dongguk Yeoji Seungnam. Yeoryang Sesigi (열양세시기), a Joseon book written in 1819 by Kim Mae-sun (김매순), refers to cooked rice and filling rolled with gim as bokssam (transcribed using the hanja , pronounced bakjeom in Korean). One other theory suggests that gimbap was introduced to Japan during the Baekje period, where it eventually developed into norimaki.

Regardless, gimbap and makizushi now refer to distinct dishes in Japan and Korea: the former called kimupapu in Japanese and the latter called gimchobap ("gim sushi") or norimaki in Korean. Gimbap is usually rolled with several ingredients and is seasoned with sesame oil, while makizushi is usually rolled with one ingredient (cucumber or raw tuna) and is seasoned with rice vinegar.

Ingredients and preparation
Gim and bap are the two basic components of gimbap. While short-grain white rice is most commonly used, short-grain brown rice, black rice, or other grains may also serve as the filling.

Some varieties of gimbap include cheese, spicy cooked squid, kimchi, luncheon meat, pork cutlet, pepper, or spicy tuna. The gim may be brushed with sesame oil or sprinkled with sesame seeds. In one variation, sliced pieces of gimbap may be lightly fried with an egg coating, which can allow stale gimbap to be re-eaten.

Fillings vary, often with vegetarian and vegan options. Popular ingredients include danmuji (yellow pickled radish), ham, beef, imitation crab meat, egg strips, kimchi, bulgogi, spinach, carrot, burdock root, cucumber, canned tuna, or kkaennip (perilla leaves).

To make the dish, gim sheets are toasted over low heat, cooked rice is lightly seasoned with salt and sesame oil, and vegetable and meat ingredients are seasoned and stir-fried or pan-fried. The toasted gim is then laid on a gimbal—a bamboo gimbap roller—with a thin layer of cooked rice placed evenly on top. Other ingredients are placed on the rice and rolled into a cylindrical shape, typically  in diameter. The rolled gimbap is then sliced into bite-sized pieces.

Variants

 Chungmu-gimbap — Originating from the seaside city of Chungmu (currently Tongyeong), the dish features thinner rolls with an unseasoned surface and only rice as the filler ingredient. It is served with spicy ojingeo-muchim (squid salad) and seokbakji (radish kimchi).
 Mayak-gimbap — A specialty of Gwangjang Market in Seoul. Mayak translates as "drug", a reference to its allegedly addictive and concentrated flavour. Small gimbap filled with carrots, spinach, and danmuji (yellow pickled radish) is sprinkled with ground sesame seeds and dipped in its pairing sauce, made from soy sauce and mustard.
 Samgak-gimbap — Literally "triangle gimbap". This variety is similar to Japanese onigiri and is sold in convenience stores in South Korea.
 Nude gimbap — Unlike traditional gimbap, while the ingredients of nude gimbap go inside the gim, the rice wraps around the outside, similar to a california roll. However, unlike a california roll, nude gimbap still uses traditional gimbap ingredients.
 Yukhoe gimbap — This variety is similar to the Japanese raw seafood makizushi but uses yukhoe—a Korean raw meat dish with pickled radish, kkaennip, and scallion.

Restaurant franchises
Many South Korean fast food restaurant franchises specialize in gimbap and noodles. Among the chains are Gimbap Cheonguk, Kobongmin Gimbabin, Chungmu Gimbab Matjuk, Teacher Kim, Gimbap Nara, Gimgane, Gobong Gimbap, Jongro Gimbap, Rolling Rice, Gimbap King ( King), and Charles Sutbul Gimbap.

See also

 Jumeok-bap
 Ssam

References

External links
 

Korean cuisine
Rice dishes